Batash was a village in eastern Turkmenistan in Lebap Province.  On 15 August 2009 it was subordinated to the Ýylangyz geňeş (village council) and made the administrative center of that council.  Subsequently, on 7 July 2016, it was annexed by the neighboring town of Döwletli.

Nearby towns and villages include Amyderya (16.6 nm), Sardoba (9.5 nm), Khadzhykulluk (6.7 nm), Dzhity-Kuduk (8.0 nm), Kausy(8.5 nm) and Yulangyz (11.4 nm) .
.

See also 
List of cities, towns and villages in Turkmenistan

References

External links
Satellite map at Maplandia.com

Populated places in Lebap Region